The following highways are numbered 784:

United States